Bertha Hernández Fernández (17 April 1907 – 11 September 1993) was the wife of the 17th President of Colombia, Mariano Ospina Pérez, and served as First Lady of Colombia from 1946 to 1950. A Conservative party politician, she was elected Senator of Colombia in 1970 and served until 1974.

A leader of the women's suffrage movement in Colombia, she was Chair of the National Feminist Organization of Colombia, a feminist, suffragist organization that aimed to bring together Colombian women regardless of political ideology or socio-economic status to lobby and work towards political recognition, inclusion, and participation for women. Founded in 1954 by Josefina Valencia Muñoz and Esmeralda Arboleda Cadavid, she served as its first Chair with María Currea Manrique as her Deputy.

Personal life
Bertha was born on 17 April 1907 in Medellín, Antioquia to Antonio María Hernández Suárez and Mercedes Fernández Echavarría. She married Mariano Ospina Pérez on 18 July 1926 at the Christian Brothers Chapel in Medellín. Mariano and Bertha had five children: Mariano, Rodrigo, Fernando, Gonzalo, and María Clara.

See also
 Carolina Vásquez Uribe

References

1907 births
1993 deaths
People from Medellín
Ospina family
Colombian suffragists
First ladies of Colombia
Colombian columnists
Members of the Senate of Colombia
20th-century Colombian women politicians
20th-century Colombian politicians
Colombian women columnists